= Titan Sadewo =

Indonesian poet and teacher

Titan Sadewo (born 1999) is an Indonesian poet and teacher from North Sumatra. He has published two poetry collections, Celakalah Orang-Orang yang Jatuh Cinta (2022) and Simulasi Sakaratul Maut (2025). His work has also been discussed in Indonesian media and in academic research on contemporary literature from Medan.

== Career ==
Sadewo's early literary work appeared in Indonesian literary publications. In 2023, IDN Times published a profile of him that discussed his introduction to literature, his work as a teacher, and the publication of his first poetry collection, Celakalah Orang-Orang yang Jatuh Cinta. The article also described the use of unconventional typography and visual elements in the collection.

His second poetry collection, Simulasi Sakaratul Maut, was published by Gramedia Pustaka Utama in 2025. Gramedia's profile of Sadewo describes him as a poet from Medan who works with visual forms and blackout poetry.

In 2025, ANTARA reported on Sadewo's participation in a literary discussion in Medan associated with Pesta Literasi Indonesia. The discussion addressed loneliness and social connection in contemporary life.

== Literary work ==
Sadewo's first collection, Celakalah Orang-Orang yang Jatuh Cinta, was published in 2022. IDN Times discussed the collection in its coverage of North Sumatran literary works and described its use of visual experimentation, including variations in typography.

Simulasi Sakaratul Maut was published by Gramedia Pustaka Utama in 2025. The collection has subsequently been discussed in literary commentary and academic research. A 2025 study in the Journal of English Language and Education included both of Sadewo's poetry collections in its corpus of contemporary literary works representing Medan. The study examined the works in relation to urban experience, memory, modernity, and social and cultural change.

== Literary programmes and festivals ==
Sadewo participated in the Payakumbuh Poetry Festival in 2023. Contemporary reports about the festival listed him among the Indonesian writers participating in the event.

Reports from the festival identified Sadewo, together with Andi Batara Al-Isra and Jaka Jono, as a winner of the festival's dystopian poetry competition.

In April 2024, Sadewo was one of 12 teachers selected for the Peta Sastra Kebangsaan workshop organized by Komunitas Salihara. The workshop was part of Salihara's programme for introducing Indonesian literature through educational methods.

In 2025, Sadewo participated in the poetry programme of the Majelis Sastra Asia Tenggara (Mastera). Media Indonesia reported his participation and quoted him discussing the opportunity to meet other poets participating in the programme.

== Bibliography ==
- Celakalah Orang-Orang yang Jatuh Cinta. Obelia Publisher, 2022.
- Simulasi Sakaratul Maut. Gramedia Pustaka Utama, 2025.
